Chronics are an Italian power pop and punk band, known for playing power pop with a garage rock attitude, and often drawing comparisons to The Saints (band) and The Real Kids. In 1999 they released their debut single on Rip Off Records (a cult record label in the 90′s along with In the Red Records and Sympathy For The Record Industry), along with two full-length albums and two best of records. After several years idle, Chronics returned in 2014 by releasing a split single on Asian Man Records with Mike Watt and the Secondmen. In 2015 they release two more split 7-inch, another split single with Mike Watt (Minutemen (band), The Stooges) and a split single with Barrence Whitfield & the Savages.

Discography

Albums
It's too late, LP, Nitro, Belgium 2002
Suggested for Mature Audiences, LP/cd, Nitro, Belgium 2004

Singles
First time, best time, 7” Rip Off Records, USA 1999

Splits
From Ciro's to Starwood, Mike Watt and the Secondmen/Chronics, Split 7-inch, Asian Man Records, USA 2014
Back In The Microwave, Mike Watt and the Secondmen/Chronics, Split 7-inch, Org Music, USA 2015
Zig Zag Wanderer/I've Got Levitation, Barrence Whitfield And The Savages/Chronics, Split 7-inch, Easy Action Records, UK 2015

Best Of
Late, lit-up & lewd (best of), cd, Hate, Italy 2003
On Tape It Sounds Different (best of), cassette, USA Mooster, 2013

Compilations
All This And More, cd, Fridge Records, 2000
Burnin' Material – Call The Firemen!! cassette, AlphaMonic, 2003
Locals Only CD compilation – La Skaletta Rock Club
Wild Sound From The Past Dimension, Go Down records, 2008

Personnel

 Stefano Toma – guitars, vocals (1996–today)
 Marco Turci – drums (2004-today)
 Stefano Felcini – bass, vocals (2013-today)
 Roberto Fabbri – bass, vocals (2000–2009)
 Davide Scibetta – drums (1996–2004)
 Gabriele Balducci – bass, vocals (1996–2000)

References
Andrea Tinti – Enciclopedia del rock bolognese (Punto E Virgola 2001)

Oderso Rubini – Largo all'avanguardia, Milano, Sonic Press, 2012

Maximumrocknroll, issue 238/Mar '03, Interview

External links
Interview on Rumore
Interview on Razorcake
Chronics on Grunnenrocks
Chronics on Facebook
Chronics releases
Rip Off Records releases
Asian Man Records

Garage punk groups
Italian pop punk groups
Musical groups established in 1996
Power pop groups